Ateshun-e Olya (also Romanized as Āteshūn-e ‘Olyā; also known as Ātashān, Āteshān, and Āteshūn) is a village in Ganjabad Rural District, Esmaili District, Anbarabad County, Kerman Province, Iran. At the 2006 census, its population was 63, in 12 families.

References 

Populated places in Anbarabad County